The Avant-Garde was an American psychedelic pop group formed by Chuck Woolery and Elkin "Bubba" Fowler in 1967. They released three singles on Columbia Records in 1967 and 1968, backed by different session musicians on each release: "Yellow Beads", "Naturally Stoned" (which hit No. 40 on the Billboard Hot 100 chart in mid-1968), and "Fly with Me!" Despite the success of "Naturally Stoned", the group disbanded after "Fly with Me!" and never released a full album.

Careers after The Avant-Garde disbanded

Fowler
After The Avant-Garde disbanded, Fowler went on to a career as a folk singer. Columbia released his LP And Then Came Bubba in 1970.  He played guitar on albums by Bob Dylan and Leonard Cohen. 

Fowler plays on the track "Avalanche" by Leonard Cohen, featured on the album Original Seeds: Songs That Inspired Nick Cave And The Bad Seeds. Ron Cornelius and Charlie Daniels also played on the track.

Woolery
Woolery became a country music artist on Warner Bros. Records and later Epic Records, charting twice with two distinct selections but never releasing an actual full-length album. He subsequently became a game show host, appearing on Wheel of Fortune for its first years on the air, Scrabble, the dating shows Love Connection and The Dating Game, Greed, and Lingo. The Avant-Garde's selection "Naturally Stoned" was also used as the theme for a reality television series on GSN that starred Woolery, titled Chuck Woolery: Naturally Stoned in 2003. This series was short-lived, lasting only thirteen installments. As "Naturally Stoned" had never been performed truly live, the first of these installments featured Woolery doing just that on his own. Fowler was not known to have been present for this.

References

Psychedelic pop music groups
American pop music groups
American musical duos
Columbia Records artists